Xunyang District is a district of the city of Jiujiang, Jiangxi province, China.

Administrative divisions
Xunyang District has 7 subdistricts.
7 subdistricts

Transport 
 Beijing–Kowloon railway

References

External links
Official website of Xunyang District government

Administrative subdivisions of Jiangxi
Jiujiang